Yousif Umar Fakharuddin (born 23 August 1998), is a Qatari professional footballer who plays as a defender for Qatar Stars League side Umm Salal.

Career
Yousif started his career at the youth team of Al-Rayyan and represented the club at every level.

Career statistics

Club

Career statistics

References

External links
 

1999 births
Living people
Qatari footballers
Association football defenders
Aspire Academy (Qatar) players
Al-Rayyan SC players
Umm Salal SC players
Qatar Stars League players